Neue Donau  is a station on  of the Vienna U-Bahn. It is located in the Floridsdorf District. It opened in 1996.

References

Buildings and structures in Floridsdorf
Railway stations opened in 1996
Vienna U-Bahn stations